Aparekke Punnananda was a Sri Lankan politician and a former member of the Parliament of Sri Lanka.

Child sex abuse charges
Punnananda appeared before Colombo Magistrates Court on 18 March 2011 after admitting he had sexually abused five underage novice Buddhist monks under his care. Two of Punnananda's alleged victims gave evidence to the magistrate who has ordered the police to produce the other three alleged victims before the court. The magistrate also ordered the police to investigate whether other underage novice monks were abused in the Budhhist temple where Punnananda is the chief incumbent. Punnananda is on bail

References

Year of birth missing (living people)
Living people
Members of the 13th Parliament of Sri Lanka
Jathika Hela Urumaya politicians
United People's Freedom Alliance politicians